The Columbus Monument may refer to:

 Columbus Monument, Barcelona, Spain
 Columbus Monument (Buyens), in Massachusetts, United States
 Columbus Monument (Canessa), in Maryland, United States
 Columbus Monument (New York City), United States
 Christopher Columbus Monument (West Orange, New Jersey), United States
 Columbus Monument (Syracuse, New York), United States

See also
 List of monuments and memorials to Christopher Columbus
 Monument to Christopher Columbus (disambiguation)
 Statue of Christopher Columbus (disambiguation)